VA-7 has the following meanings:
Virginia State Route 7
Virginia's 7th congressional district